Pooja Batra Shah (born 27 October) is an Indian-American actress and model who primarily works in Hindi films. She was runner-up at the Miss India contest in 1993.

Early life and background
Batra was born on 27 October to Ravi Batra, an army colonel and Neelam Batra, a Miss India (1971) participant. She lived in Ludhiana with her extended family while she was young. While in school, she was an athlete and competed in the 200 and 400-meter dash. She is related to Second Lieutenant Arun Khetarpal.

She graduated in Economics from Fergusson College, Pune and holds an MBA in marketing from Symbiosis, Pune. She has two brothers. She participated at the Miss International in 1993.

Career
At a young age, she started modelling as a part-time job. She was best known for her Liril soap commercial. She was the first Indian face to launch and be a spokesperson for Head and Shoulders in India. She has participated in over 250 modeling events and ad campaigns. She shot to fame when she was crowned Miss India International in 1993. She went on to become one of the top models in India. She walked the ramp for over 250 fashion shows in India and overseas. She is an ambassador for Parag Sarees.

Batra turned down many offers to complete her education before signing a contract with the Virasat Film Studio. The first film she signed was Virasat in 1997 followed by another hit movie Bhai. She went on to work in over 20 films including Haseena Maan Jayegi, Dil Ne Phir Yaad Kiya and Kahin Pyaar Na Ho Jaaye. One of her films, Taj Mahal: An Eternal Love Story, a historical epic, was shown at the Cannes Film Festival in 2004. She is a life member of International Film And Television Club of Asian Academy of Film & Television, Noida.

Batra has also appeared in South Indian films, including three Malayalam films and two Tamil films, including a cameo in the 1995 film Aasai. 

Batra has acted in theater and toured North America, which earned her considerable acclaim.

She appeared at the 2009 Academy Awards in Los Angeles, where she reunited with her Virasat costar, Anil Kapoor.

She is set to appear as Nandini Rajput in the upcoming movie Squad.<ref>{{Cite news |title=Pooja Batras film Draupadi Unleashed to release theatrically in US |url=https://www.outlookindia.com/newsscroll/pooja-batras-film-draupadi-unleashed-to-release-theatrically-in-us/1941264 |access-date=9 February 2021 |work=Outlook |date=23 September 2020}}</ref>

Personal life
Batra was married to orthopaedic surgeon Dr. Sonu S. Ahluwalia in Los Angeles, California from 2002 to 2010. In January 2011 she filed for divorce, citing irreconcilable differences.

Batra revealed her relationship with actor Nawab Shah in June 2019. They got married on 4 July 2019 in Delhi according to Arya Samaj traditions.

Philanthropy
Batra has volunteered time and money to charitable causes including AIDS (Mukti Foundation), homeless children, the Bombay Police Department and injured soldiers in the Kashmir war.

She did pro bono work in the film My Little Devil (Bas Yari Rakho''), subtitled in Hindi, English, and French, to raise funds for the poor children in India. The film was co-produced by NFDC-La Fete (Canada) and directed by Gopi Desai. It was screened at the 24th Annual Montreal World Film Festival, 2000; Chicago International Children's Film Festival, 2000; 10th Annual Philadelphia Film Festival of World Cinema, 2001; and the Indian Film Festival in Malaysia, 2005.

Filmography

Awards and nominations

Notes

References

External links

 
 
 

1974 births
Living people
People from Faizabad
Actresses from Uttar Pradesh
Female models from Uttar Pradesh
Indian film actresses
Femina Miss India winners
Miss International 1993 delegates
Indian emigrants to the United States
Naturalized citizens of the United States
Actresses from Los Angeles
American film actresses
American actresses of Indian descent
American female models of Indian descent
American expatriate actresses in India
Actresses in Hindi cinema
Actresses in Telugu cinema
Actresses in Malayalam cinema
Actresses in Tamil cinema
Kendriya Vidyalaya alumni
Savitribai Phule Pune University alumni
20th-century Indian actresses
21st-century Indian actresses
21st-century American women
21st-century American actresses